The 1991 Mid-Continent Conference Tournament took place from May 10 through 13. The top 4 regular season finishers of the league's seven teams met in the double-elimination tournament held in Chicago, Illinois.  won the tournament for the first and only time.

Format and seeding
The top three teams from each division advanced to the tournament.  With four teams in the Blue Division, only  did not participate.

Tournament
Bracket to be included

Game-by-game results

All-Tournament Team

Tournament Most Valuable Player
Larry Rubin of UIC was named Tournament MVP.

References

Tournament
Summit League Baseball Tournament
Mid-Continent Conference baseball tournament
Mid-Continent Conference baseball tournament